Miguel Peirano  (born 30 June 1960) is a former Uruguayan footballer who played as a defender.

Club career
Peirano played for C.A. Peñarol and C.A. Progreso in the Primera División Uruguaya. He played in the Spanish La Liga with Sevilla F.C. during the 1984-85 season. He also had a spell in the Greek Super League with Levadiakos F.C. during the 1987–88 and 1988-89 seasons.

International career
Peirano appeared for the senior Uruguayan soccer team at the 1983 Pan American Games, scoring the game-winning goal in the final against Brazil.

References

1960 births
Living people
Uruguayan footballers
Uruguay international footballers
Peñarol players
C.A. Progreso players
Sevilla FC players
L.D.U. Quito footballers
Levadiakos F.C. players
Esporte Clube XV de Novembro (Jaú) players
Expatriate footballers in Spain
Expatriate footballers in Greece
Expatriate footballers in Ecuador
Expatriate footballers in Brazil
Association football defenders
Pan American Games gold medalists for Uruguay
Footballers at the 1983 Pan American Games
Medalists at the 1983 Pan American Games
Pan American Games medalists in football